Andriy Kovalenco (born 12 July 1971, in Kyiv) is a Ukrainian-born Spanish rugby union player. He plays as a fly-half.

Career
Kovalenco started playing rugby at 14 years old, in Aviator Kiev, where he had his first game for the premier team aged only 16. He played for Aviator Kyiv from 1987/88 to 1988/89. Due to the military service he had to move to VVA Moscow, the Army team, where he would play from 1989/90 to 1990/91. He won one Soviet League title and two Soviet Cups with VVA Moscow. He had his first game for the USSR in 1990, aged only 19 years old. He then returned to Aviator Kyiv, playing there from 1991/92 to 1993/94. He then moved to the Spanish side of CRC Madrid Noroeste, that he would represent most of his career, from 1994/95 to 2003/04. He won the Spanish League in 1999/2000 and three titles of the Copa del Rey, in 2001, 2002 and 2003. He also would play for Barcelona Universitari Club, from 2004/05 to 2005/06, FC Barcelona Rugby, from 2006/07 to 2007/08, and once again for Barcelona Universitari Club, since 2008/09.

Kovalenco played for three National Teams, the Soviet Union, Ukraine and after becoming a Spanish citizen, Spain. He had 37 caps during this time, being one of the highest scoring players for Spain during his international career, from 1998 to 2006, with 2 tries, 11 conversions, 49 penalties and 1 drop goal, for an aggregate of 220 points.

He played two games at the 1999 Rugby World Cup, scoring 5 penalties, all the entire 15 points score in the 27–15 loss to Uruguay.

External links
 Andrei Kovalenco International Statistics
 Andrei Kovalenco Interview (Spanish)

1971 births
Living people
Sportspeople from Kyiv
Soviet rugby union players
Ukrainian rugby union players
Spanish rugby union players
Ukrainian emigrants to Spain
Rugby union fly-halves
Spain international rugby union players